Gourma-Rharous Cercle  is an administrative subdivision of the Tombouctou Region of Mali. The administrative center is the town of Gourma-Rharous.

The route of the annual circular migration of the Gourma elephants crosses a number of communes in the cercles of Gourma-Rharous and Douentza (Mopti Region). Lake Banzena in the commune of Bambara Maoudé serves as an important source of water for the elephants at the end of the dry season (April to June).

The cercle is divided into nine communes:

Bambara Maoudé
Banikane
Gossi
Hamzakoma
Haribomo
Inadiatafane
Ouinerden
Rharous
Séréré

References

Cercles of Mali
Tombouctou Region